The 2001–02 Copa Federación de España was the ninth staging of the Copa Federación de España, a knockout competition for Spanish football clubs in Segunda División B and Tercera División.

The Regional stages began in 2001, while the national tournament took place during the 2001–02 season.

Regional tournaments

Asturias tournament

Group A

Group B

Group C

Group D

Final bracket

Castile and León tournament

National tournament

Round of 32

|}

Round of 16

|}

Quarter-finals

|}

Semifinals

|}

Final

|}

References
2000–2009 Copa Federación results

Copa Federación de España seasons